The 2008 Summer Olympics were held in Beijing, People's Republic of China, from 8 August to 24 August 2008. A total of 10,942 athletes from 204 National Olympic Committees (NOC) participated. Overall, 302 events in 28 sports were held; 165 events were opened to men, 127 were opened to women and 10 were mixed events. In total there was one more event than in the 2004 Summer Olympics in Athens, Greece.

Nine new events were held, including two from the new cycling discipline of BMX. Women competed in the 3000 metre steeplechase for the first time. Marathon open water swimming events for men and women, over the distance of 10 kilometres, were added to the swimming discipline. Team events (men and women) in table tennis replaced the doubles events. In fencing, women's team foil and women's team sabre replaced men's team foil and women's team épée. Two sports were open only to men, baseball and boxing, while one sport and one discipline were open only to women, softball and synchronized swimming. Equestrian is the only sport in which men and women compete together in the same events. Baseball and softball may have made their last appearances in Olympics history during these Games, as the International Olympic Committee voted to remove them from the programme of the 2012 Olympics. A total of 958 medals for events (302 gold, 303 silver and 353 bronze) were awarded. In boxing, judo, taekwondo and wrestling, two bronze medals are awarded in each weight class. Therefore, the total number of bronze medals is greater than the total number of gold or silver medals. Additionally there were ties for a silver medal and two bronze medals.

A total of 1,881 individual athletes won medals. Chinese athletes won the most gold medals with 48 (100 total), and the United States won the most total medals with 112 (including 36 gold). Athletes from 87 countries won medals, while 55 nations won at least one gold medal, both setting new records for Olympic Games. Athletes from Afghanistan (Rohullah Nikpai – Taekwondo, men's 58 kg), Mauritius (Bruno Julie – boxing, bantamweight), Sudan (Ismail Ahmed Ismail – athletics, men's 800 m), Tajikistan (Rasul Boqiev – judo, men's 73 kg), and Togo (Benjamin Boukpeti – canoeing, men's K-1 slalom) won their NOCs' first Olympic medal. Athletes from Mongolia (Naidangiin Tüvshinbayar – judo, men's 100 kg), and Panama (Irving Saladino – athletics, men's long jump) won their nations' first gold medal.

American swimmer Michael Phelps was the most successful athlete, winning eight gold medals and setting a new record for most golds won in a single edition of the Olympics (the previous record, seven, had been set in 1972 by Mark Spitz). Phelps also set a new record for most career gold medals (14), and his 16 total medals were ranked second all-time behind Soviet gymnast Larisa Latynina (18) at the time. In 2012 Phelps set a record for most total medals. Several records for career medals in a sport were tied or surpassed, including cycling (Bradley Wiggins of the United Kingdom won two gold, tied for record with six career medals); judo (Ryoko Tani of Japan won a bronze, five career medals); softball (Laura Berg of the United States won a gold and Natalie Ward, Melanie Roche and Tanya Harding of Australia won a bronze; all have four career medals); swimming (Michael Phelps, 16 career medals); taekwondo (Steven López of the United States won a bronze and Hadi Saei of Iran won a gold, both three career medals); and table tennis (Wang Nan of China won a gold and silver medal, five career medals).

2008 Olympics has the most medals stripped for doping violations (50). The leading country is Russia with 14 medals stripped.

{| id="toc" class="toc" summary="Contents"
|-
| style="text-align:center;" colspan=3|Contents
|-
|
Archery
Athletics
Badminton
Baseball
Basketball
Boxing
Canoeing
Cycling
Diving
Equestrian
Fencing
|valign=top|
Field hockey
Football
Gymnastics
Handball
Judo
Modern pentathlon
Rowing
Sailing
Shooting
Softball
|valign=top|
Swimming
Synchronized swimming
Table tennis
Taekwondo
Tennis
Triathlon
Volleyball
Water polo
Weightlifting
Wrestling
|-
| style="text-align:center;" colspan="3"|       Statistics       References
|}


Archery

Athletics

Badminton

Baseball

Basketball

Boxing

Canoeing

Flatwater

Slalom

Cycling

Road

Track

Mountain bike

BMX

Diving

Equestrian

Fencing

Field hockey

Football

Gymnastics

Artistic

Rhythmic

Trampoline

Handball

Judo

Modern pentathlon

Rowing

Sailing

Shooting

Softball

Swimming

Synchronized swimming

Table tennis

Taekwondo

Tennis

Triathlon

Volleyball

Beach

Indoor

Water polo

Weightlifting

Wrestling

Freestyle

Greco-Roman

Statistics

Medal leaders
Athletes that won at least three gold medals or at least four total medals are listed below.

Source:

Medal winner changes

A. Belarusian athletes Vadim Devyatovskiy and Ivan Tsikhan, who won silver and bronze respectively in the men's hammer throw, both tested positive for abnormal levels of testosterone. After attending a disciplinary hearing in September, they were stripped of their medals on December 11, 2008. Krisztián Pars of Hungary was given the silver medal, and Koji Murofushi of Japan was given the bronze. On June 10, 2010, following a successful appeal to the Court of Arbitration for Sport, Devyatovskiy and Tsikhan had their medals reinstated.

B. Ukrainian athlete Lyudmyla Blonska, who finished second in the women's heptathlon, tested positive for the steroid methyltestosterone. On August 22, 2008, the International Olympic Committee officially stripped Blonska of her medal, and as a result, the silver medal went to Hyleas Fountain of the United States, and the bronze medal to Tatyana Chernova of Russia.

C. Norwegian equestrian athlete Tony André Hansen's horse tested positive for the pain relieving medication capsaicin, a banned substance. Hansen, who won a bronze medal in the team jumping event, was disqualified. In the team jumping system, the top three scores garnered by the four riders are counted. Hansen had the best score on his team, and it was removed from the total. Without Hansen's score, his team was below the bronze medal threshold so the medal was awarded to the team from Switzerland on December 22, 2008.

D. On August 15, 2008, the International Olympic Committee announced North Korean shooter Kim Jong-su had tested positive for the banned substance propranolol and was stripped of his two medals. He had won a bronze medal in the 10 metre air pistol and silver in the 50 metre pistol. After Kim Jong-su was disqualified, the bronze medal in the 10 metre air pistol went to Jason Turner of the United States; in the 50 metre pistol, the silver medal went to Tan Zongliang of China, and the bronze medal to Vladimir Isakov of Russia.

E. Swedish wrestler Ara Abrahamian was originally awarded a bronze medal in the Greco-Roman 84 kg event. However, at the medal ceremony he walked off the podium and dropped his medal on the mat in protest of the judging in his event. On August 16, 2008, the International Olympic Committee decided to strip him of his medal because they felt it amounted to a political demonstration and was disrespectful to other athletes.

F. On November 18, 2009, the IOC announced that Rashid Ramzi of Bahrain had been stripped of the gold medal in the men's 1500 m race. Ramzi had been the first athlete from Bahrain to win an Olympic gold medal. His frozen blood sample was re-tested and found to contain traces of Continuous erythropoietin receptor activator (CERA), a stamina-building blood-booster. Kenyan Asbel Kipruto Kiprop was upgraded to gold, Nicholas Willis of New Zealand was given the silver and Mehdi Baala of France received the bronze.

G. On November 18, 2009, the IOC announced that Italian cyclist Davide Rebellin had tested positive for Cera and had been stripped of the silver medal he earned in the men's road race. Switzerland's Fabian Cancellara was upgraded to silver and Russia's Alexandr Kolobnev was given the bronze.

Notes
Note 1. Although the official opening of the Games was on 8 August 2008, football matches were held beginning on 6 August.

Note 2. The fencing programme included six individual events and four team events, though the team events were a different set than were held in 2004. The International Fencing Federation's rules call for events not held in the previous Games to receive automatic selection and for at least one team event in each weapon to be held. Voting is conducted to determine the fourth event. In 2004, the three men's team events and the women's épée were held. Thus, in 2008, the women's foil and sabre events and men's épée were automatically selected. Men's sabre was chosen over foil by a 45–20 vote.

See also
 2008 Summer Olympics medal table

References

External links

 Official website of the 2008 Summer Olympics

Medalists
2008